Bangladesh Super League (BSL) was a planned professional football league, sanctioned by Bangladesh Football Federation, that was meant to represent the sport's highest level in Bangladesh. The league was inaugurated by Bangladesh Football Federation on 18 January 2016. The league was to be contested by eight clubs, with the first season scheduled for 2017.

The tournament was cancelled due to few stadiums and problems with infrastructure.

Foundation
On 18 January 2016, the Bangladesh Football Federation entered a 15-year deal with Saif Powertech and Celebrity Management Group. The 70-crores deal gave Powertech-CMG exclusive commercial rights to sponsorship, advertising, broadcasting, merchandising, video, franchising and rights to create a new football league.

The league will get technical assistance from Bangladesh Football Federation, which is in talks with Union of European Football Associations and South American Football Confederation for assistance with foreign coaches and management staff. Each team will have minimum five foreign players in playing eleven.

Teams
Chittagong, Rangpur, Dhaka, Khulna, Barishal, Rajshahi, Sylhet, Mymensingh.

Rights holder
Saif Powertec Ltd. along with CMG have already bought the tournament rights for 15 years.

Logo
On 28 February 2016, the BSL logo was unveiled at a grand ceremony at the Bangabandhu National Stadium, Dhaka.

References

 
Bangladesh
Football leagues in Bangladesh
Summer association football leagues
Sports leagues established in 2016
2016 establishments in Bangladesh